Le Pied-De-Vent  is a raw cow-milk cheese from the Magdalen Islands region, in Quebec, Canada. This soft cheese is produced by La Fromagerie du Pied-de-Vent. Pied-de-Vent is made with milk from Canadienne cattle. Its name comes from a French-Canadian expression meaning "the sun's rays piercing through the clouds".

More information
Type: soft paste, raw milk
Manufacturer: Fromagerie du Pied-De-Vent
Fat content: 27%
Humidity content: 50%

See also
 List of cheeses

References

External links

 Fromagerie du Pied-De-Vent

Pied-de-Vent
Pied-de-Vent